Aktas Dağı is a mountain in western Asia, on the international border between Iran and Turkey.

Mountains of Turkey
International mountains of Asia
Iran–Turkey border
Mountains of West Azerbaijan Province
Mountains of the Armenian Highlands